Pavel Parshin (born 22 December 1919) was a Soviet sailor. He competed in the 5.5 Metre event at the 1960 Summer Olympics.

References

External links
 

1919 births
Possibly living people
Soviet male sailors (sport)
Olympic sailors of the Soviet Union
Sailors at the 1960 Summer Olympics – 5.5 Metre
Sportspeople from Saint Petersburg